Van Fleet is a surname; it is an Americanized spelling of the Dutch surname van Vliet. Notable people with the surname include:

Beth Van Fleet (born 1977), American beach volleyball player
James Van Fleet (1892–1992), United States Army officer
Jo Van Fleet (1914–1996), American actress
Melissa VanFleet (born 1986), American singer-songwriter
Vernon W. Van Fleet (c. 1866–1932), chair of the Federal Trade Commission
William Cary Van Fleet (1852–1923), American judge

See also

Van Vleet

Surnames of Dutch origin